Galatea metro station is located in Catania in Sicily, southern Italy. It is served by the Catania Metro and it was opened the 11th of July 1999. It serves the urban zone of piazza Galatea, viale Jonio, via Pasubio and surroundings and actually is the 4th station of the Borgo-Porto line. It is the 8th station of the Nesima-Stesicoro line. It is located at 500m from the seafront.

References

Catania Metro stations
Railway stations opened in 1999
1999 establishments in Italy
Railway stations in Italy opened in the 20th century